Atomiscala xenophyes is a species of sea snail, a marine gastropod mollusc in the family Cimidae.

According to a study published in November 2011 in Zootaxa, this species does not belong in Eulimella

Description
The shell grows to a length of 2. 75 mm

Distribution
This marine species occurs off Argentina and Tierra del Fuego.

References

External links
 To Encyclopedia of Life

Cimidae
Gastropods described in 1912